Independence Day is a 1983 American drama film directed by Robert Mandel from a script by the novelist Alice Hoffman. It was designed by Stewart Campbell and shot by Charles Rosher. It stars Kathleen Quinlan, David Keith, Cliff DeYoung, Frances Sternhagen and Dianne Wiest.

The film concerns the small-town life of an artist (Quinlan) and her challenge to become "what she's almost sure she could be." "Her desperation takes the form of affectations and pretensions that are a little like those of the young Katharine Hepburn in Alice Adams and the young Margaret Sullavan in The Shop Around the Corner, but the Quinlan character "has the talent driving her on past all that." Wiest plays a battered wife.

The film was reviewed favorably by the critic Pauline Kael in her collection State of the Art: "Kathleen Quinlan plays the part of the woman artist with a cool, wire-taut intensity, Robert Mandel keeps the whole cast interacting quietly and satisfyingly, Wiest has hold of an original character and plays her to the scary hilt." After years only available on  VHS, Independence Day got a DVD release by the Warner Archive Collection in November 2015.

Plot
In the small town of Mercury, New Mexico (the film actually was shot in Anson, Texas), where she works as a waitress in her family's diner, Mary Ann Taylor's true love is photography. She would like to get beyond these limits, but when Jack Parker returns to town, he lets her know that he's been to the big city and happiness there is as elusive as anyplace else.

Mary Ann and Jack fall in love. Their bliss is interrupted, however, by the discovery that Jack's meek sister is being physically abused by her husband. Jack tries to intervene, but in the end, Nancy intentionally triggers a gas explosion, killing her husband and herself.

Cast
 Kathleen Quinlan as Mary Ann Taylor
 David Keith as Jack Parker
 Frances Sternhagen as Carla Taylor
 Cliff DeYoung as Les Morgan
 Dianne Wiest as Nancy Morgan
 Josef Sommer as Sam Taylor
 Bert Remsen as Red
 Richard Farnsworth as Evan
 Brooke Alderson as Shelly
 Noble Willingham as Andy Parker
 Cheryl Smith as Ginny (Smith's final film role)
 Jeff Polk as Billy Morgan 
 Zachary DeLoach as Joey Morgan

Release
Following a handful of less than ecstatic test engagements, Independence Day was quietly withdrawn from distribution as the under performance was seen as confirmation of the doubts raised by Warner Bros. marketing division regarding the viability of the film.

References

External links

1983 films
1983 drama films
American drama films
Melodrama films
1983 directorial debut films
1980s English-language films
Films directed by Robert Mandel
Films shot in Texas
Films scored by Charles Bernstein
Films set in New Mexico
Warner Bros. films
1980s American films